Hasht Pashtuleh (also Romanized as Hasht Pashtūleh; also known as Hasht Pashūleh) is a village in Sharvineh Rural District, Kalashi District, Javanrud County, Kermanshah Province, Iran. At the 2006 census, its population was 20, in 4 families.

References 

Populated places in Javanrud County